Jahan Bagcha Teesta Rangeet (Where Teesta and Rangeet Flow) is a song that serves as the de facto state song for Sikkim, India.

History
The Kingdom of Sikkim became a British protectorate in 1860 and following Indian independence in 1947, became a protectorate of India in 1950. During this period, Sikkim was an absolute monarchy ruled by a monarch known as the Chogyal. The national anthem of the Kingdom of Sikkim was Denjong Silé Yang Chagpa Chilo (Why is Sikkim Blooming So Fresh and Beautiful?), in the Sikkimese language.

The Nepali language song Jahan Bagcha Teesta Rangeet was released 4 April 1970 to mark the birthday of the then Chogyal Palden Thondup Namgyal. The song became very popular and was sometimes erroneously cited as the Sikkimese national anthem. Following a referendum in 1975, Sikkim became a state of India and the monarchy was abolished. The song was initially prohibited by the Indian authorities as it contained a reference to the Sikkemese monarchy. It was later reinstated with slightly altered lyrics which replaced the words "Raja Rani" ("king and queen") with "Janmahbhumi" ("motherland"). Nowadays, the song is used as the de facto state song for Sikkim, played at state government functions and social gatherings.

Lyrics

See also
List of Indian state songs
Emblem of Sikkim

References

External links
 
 

Indian state songs
Nepali-language songs